The Ghosts of Garip (also known as Kanlı Girdap & Vlad's Legacy) directed by Patricio Valladares, is a Turkish Film. Gianni Capaldi and Selma Ergeç star in this found footage horror film. Film was released on 11 July 2016 in Turkey.

Plot 
Filmmaker John Gillespie and his crew travel to Turkey to document the legend of Vlad The Impaler, only to find themselves caught up in a centuries-old conspiracy in a village nestled on the outskirts of Istanbul.

Cast
Selma Ergeç as Nina
Gianni Capaldi as John
Selim Bayraktar as Ali
Natalia Guslistaya as Bella
Guillermo Iván as Carlos
Larry Wade Carrell as Brad
Laia Gonzàlez as Ana

References

External links 
 

2016 films
Films directed by Patricio Valladares
Films shot in Istanbul
Found footage films
2016 horror films
English-language Turkish films
Films set in Turkey
Turkish horror films
2010s English-language films